The phrase No Good may refer to:

 No Good (group), an American hip-hop group
 "No Good (Start the Dance)", a song by the Prodigy
No Good (Fedde Le Grand song), a 2013 remake of above
 "No Good", a song by Plan B from Who Needs Actions When You Got Words
 "No Good", a song by Kate Voegele from Don't Look Away
 "No Good", a song by Nappy Roots from Wooden Leather
 "No Good (Attack the Radical)", a song by Pantera from Vulgar Display of Power
 No Good (album)
 Spirit Hunter: NG, a video game